Augusto "Gus" Binelli (born 23 September 1964) is a retired Italian professional basketball player and coach. Binelli was drafted in the second round, of the 1986 NBA draft, by the Atlanta Hawks, though he never played in the NBA.

Professional career
Binelli played with the senior men's team of Virtus Bologna, from 1980 to 2000. With Virtus Bologna, he won 5 Italian League championships (1984, 1993, 1994, 1995, 1998), 5 Italian Cups (1984, 1989, 1990, 1997, 1999), the EuroLeague championship (1998), and the FIBA European Cup Cup Winner's Cup (FIBA Saporta Cup) (1990).  He was also a 2-time McDonald's Open finalist (1993, 1995).

He was a member of the FIBA European Selection team, in 1995.

Italian national team
Binelli played with the senior Italian national basketball team, at the EuroBasket 1985, where he won a bronze medal. He also played at the 1986 FIBA World Championship, and at the EuroBasket 1989.

Awards and Accomplishments

Clubs
5× Italian League Champion: (1984, 1993, 1994, 1995, 1998)
5× Italian Cup Winner: (1984, 1989, 1990, 1997, 1999)
FIBA European Cup Winners' Cup (FIBA Saporta Cup) Champion: (1990)
Italian Supercup Winner: (1995)
FIBA European Selection: (1995)
EuroLeague Champion: (1998)

Italian senior national team
1985 EuroBasket:

External links 
FIBA Profile
FIBA Europe Profile
Italian League Profile 

1964 births
Living people
Atlanta Hawks draft picks
Centers (basketball)
Italian expatriate basketball people in the United States
Italian men's basketball coaches
Italian men's basketball players
Pallacanestro Trapani players
Sutor Basket Montegranaro players
Virtus Bologna players
1986 FIBA World Championship players